Ron James Newsome (September 15, 1943 – April 17, 2012) was an American football coach.  He served as the head football coach at Western New Mexico University from 1973 to 1975 where he achieved a record of 11–15.

Prior to that, Newsome was an assistant coach for the East Texas State's 1972 NAIA championship team.  He was the defensive coordinator at Tarleton State University from 1983 to 1986.

Head coaching record

References

1946 births
2012 deaths
Tarleton State Texans football coaches
Texas A&M–Commerce Lions football coaches
Western New Mexico Mustangs football coaches
People from Pittsburg, Texas